The Settlement may refer to:

Films 
 The Settlement (1984 film)
 The Settlement (1999 film)

Places 
 The Settlement, British Virgin Islands, the main town on Anegada
 Edinburgh of the Seven Seas, capital and main settlement of Tristan da Cunha
 Flying Fish Cove, the main settlement on Christmas Island